Alnes is a small village in Giske Municipality in Møre og Romsdal county, Norway. The rest of the island's population is located on the southern half of the island, separated from Alnes by a large mountain. Alnes is accessible through a tunnel through the mountainous center part of the island.

The predominant feature of the village is the Alnes Lighthouse which was built in 1876. The lighthouse is still in operation and it is accessible for tourists. It also houses an art gallery and a small historical museum.  In 2006, the population was 205, but as the population dropped below 200 the next year, so Alnes is no longer counted as an urban settlement and so the population is no longer tracked by Statistics Norway.

References

Villages in Møre og Romsdal
Giske